North End, London may refer to:

North End, Bexley
North End, Camden, in the Municipal Borough of Hendon

See also
North End (disambiguation)